Gateshead is a constituency represented in the House of Commons of the UK Parliament since it was re-established in 2010 by Ian Mearns of the Labour Party.

History

First creation 
The seat was first created by the Reform Act 1832 as a single-member parliamentary borough. It was abolished under the Representation of the People Act 1948 for the 1950 general election and split into Gateshead East and Gateshead West.

Revival 
As a result of the Boundary Commission's Fifth Periodic Review of Westminster constituencies, the seat was re-established for the 2010 general election, combining over half of the electorates of both of the abolished constituencies of Gateshead East and Washington West, and Tyne Bridge.

Boundaries

1832-1918 
Under the Parliamentary Boundaries Act 1832, the contents of the borough were defined as the Parish of Gateshead and part of the Chapelry of Heworth in the Parish of Jarrow.

See map on Vision of Britain website.

1918-1950 

 The County Borough of Gateshead.

No change to boundaries.

2010–present 

 The Metropolitan Borough of Gateshead wards of Bridges, Chowdene, Deckham, Dunston and Teams, Felling, High Fell, Lobley Hill and Bensham, Low Fell, Saltwell, and Windy Nook and Whitehills.

Constituency profile 
Under the current boundaries, the constituency is overwhelmingly White, and working-class; with 95% of its electorate identifying as White British and being in the top decile of constituencies for routine work. The area's politics are influenced by these demographics; with the exception of Low Fell, all of the wards that make up the constituency are safely Labour areas, and the constituency voted overwhelmingly to leave the European Union, like the borough as a whole.

Members of Parliament
Among famous representatives are James Melville KC who was Solicitor General for England and Wales before he died, while holding the seat, and international statesman Konni Zilliacus who assisted in creating peaceful bilateral relations during the Cold War, including though work at the United Nations.

MPs 1832–1950

MPs since 2010

Elections

Elections in the 2010s

Elections in the 1940s

Elections in the 1930s 

Conservative candidate Charles White withdrew on 15 October 1931. Barr and Fennell also withdrew, but their names remained on the ballot paper.

Sir James Melville died on 1 May 1931, leading to a by-election on 8 June. The winner of the by-election, Herbert Evans, himself died on 7 October, the day parliament was dissolved for the 1931 general election.

Elections in the 1920s

Elections in the 1910s

Elections in the 1900s

Elections in the 1890s

 Caused by James' succession to the peerage as Lord Northbourne.

Elections in the 1880s

Elections in the 1870s

 Arbuthnot retired from the race the day before polling.

Elections in the 1860s

 Caused by Hutt's appointment as Vice-President of the Board of Trade.

Elections in the 1850s

Elections in the 1840s

Elections in the 1830s

See also
 1931 Gateshead by-election
 List of parliamentary constituencies in Tyne and Wear
 History of parliamentary constituencies and boundaries in Tyne and Wear
 History of parliamentary constituencies and boundaries in Durham

Notes

References
Specific

General
Craig, F. W. S. (1983). British parliamentary election results 1918-1949 (3 ed.). Chichester: Parliamentary Research Services. .

Sources
 

Politics of Gateshead
Parliamentary constituencies in County Durham (historic)
Parliamentary constituencies in Tyne and Wear
Constituencies of the Parliament of the United Kingdom established in 1832
Constituencies of the Parliament of the United Kingdom disestablished in 1950
Constituencies of the Parliament of the United Kingdom established in 2010